Botir Zokirov (26 April 1936 – 23 January 1985) was a Soviet and Uzbek singer, writer, poet, painter and actor, who is considered to be the founder of Uzbek pop music. He is the People's artist of Uzbekistan.

Biography 
Zokirov studied at the Tashkent Institute of Theatre and Arts named after Ostrovskiy. In 1972, he created the first in the East and the third in Soviet Union pop troupe titled Music Hall. Together with the Russian director Mark Zakharov and an actor of Moscow Satire Theatre Aleksandr Shirvindt, Zokirov created the musical 1973rd journey of Sinbad the Sailor. Prominent singers such as Vladimir Vysotsky, Irina Ponarovskaya and bands such as Poyushchiye Gitary, Yalla (band) from various countries of USSR performed in Music Hall too.

Zokirov was one of the founders of the Uzbek Soviet Socialist Republic State Estrada Orchestra. In 1964 he spend several months in Kremlin Hospital (now Moscow Central Clinical Hospital), followed by a lung surgery. Zokirov died on 23 January 1985 in Tashkent.

Songs and performances
Zokirov gained a wide popularity due to singing in many languages including Uzbek, Russian, Arabic and French. A song "Ya Zahratan Fi Khayali" (يا زهرة في خيالي – "Flower of my imagination) by one of the most important figures of 20th Century Arab music  Farid al-Atrash, performed by Zokirov at the International Festival of Youth and Students in Moscow in 1957 made him extremely popular.

In 1966 Zokirov became the only Uzbek and one of very few Soviet singers singing at the Olympia (Paris). He performed Enrico Macias's famous song Les Filles De Mon Pays in French.

Filmography

Roles in movies 
 1959 — Kогда цветут розы (1959) (When Roses Bloom) — as Batyr
 1969 — Похищение (1969) (Kidnapping) — Batyrov
 1982 — Огненные дороги (1982) (Flame Roads) — Rabindranath Tagore
 1982 — Юность гения (1982) (Genius' Youth) — Abdullah

Family and personal life 
Zokirov is the eldest brother of Farrukh Zokirov, leader of Yalla (band) from Uzbekistan.

In 1957 he married actress Erkli Malikbaeva, and had two sons: Bakhtiyor Zakirov and Bakhodir Zakirov. They divorced in 1974.

His second marriage was with a ballet dancer Galina. Their daughter Rukhshana Zakirova was born in 1976.

References 

1936 births
1985 deaths
20th-century Uzbekistani male actors
20th-century Uzbekistani male singers
Musicians from Moscow
Recipients of the Order of the Red Banner of Labour
Uzbekistani culture
Soviet male film actors
Soviet male singers
Soviet translators
Uzbekistani male film actors
Uzbekistani male singers
Uzbekistani translators
Deaths from cirrhosis